Whittle Rock is a granite corestone reef and navigation hazard in False Bay, Western Cape, South Africa. The reef rises from a sandy bottom at about 40 m, to a minimum depth of 3.2 m, and is a well known fishing site and recreational diving area. It has an area of about 1 km2, and can affect the waves at the shore in Kalk Bay in special conditions of a long southeasterly swell. It is marked by a cardinal east buoy with sound and light signals.

Location and extent 
Whittle Rock is about 8 km to the east of Miller's Point which is on the coast of the Cape Peninsula just south of Simon's Town, on the west side of False Bay, at  The contiguous reef is a bit over 1 km east to west, and a bit under 1 km north to south. There are several outliers in the order of 100 m size range, within 100m of the main reef, and a lot more that are smaller. Several other granite outcrops and clusters of smaller size and greater depth exist in the vicinity. The official depth of the top of the reef is 3.2m below datum.

Bathymetry 

Minimum depth according to the chart is 3.2 m at low tide, and maximum depth at the edge of the reef is about 42 m in the south. Most of the reef is above 30 m, and a fairly large amount above 18 m, the official limit for most entry level scuba certification.

Geology 
Whittle Rock and the other reefs of this part of False Bay are outcrops of the Peninsula Granite, a huge batholith that was intruded into the Malmesbury Group about 630 million years ago as molten rock and crystallised deep in the earth, but has since then been exposed by prolonged erosion. The characteristic spheroidal shapes of granite boulders are a result of preferential weathering along intersecting fractures and are well displayed above sea level around Llandudno and Simonstown. Close up, the granite is a coarse-grained rock consisting of large (2–5 cm) white or pink feldspar crystals, glassy brown quartz and flakes of black mica, and occasionally containing inclusions of dark Malmesbury hornfels.

Though initially intruded at great depth, prolonged erosion eventually exposed the granite at the surface and it and what remains of the similarly eroded Malmesbury group now form a basement upon which younger sedimentary rocks of the Table Mountain Group were deposited.

Almost all the exposed granite has been extensively weathered and is in the form of rounded corestones. The colour is generally pale to medium grey, and the surface is typically fairly rough, with clearly visible crystals, and no layered structure. The massive rock is cracked on jointing planes, which tend to be characteristic of the location, and weathering has accentuated these joints, in places widening them to form deep gullies. The general direction and spacing of joints in some areas is fairly consistent over quite large areas.

There are areas of rubble, gravel, pebbles, and shell along the edges of the reef, with much of the pebbled area to the north, but the surrounding surficial unconsolidated material is predominantly fine sand at depths from 30 to 42 m.

History 
In 1672 the Dutch warship Goudvinck was stationed at the Cape and was instructed to survey False Bay, but it is not known how much was done before they were recalled. Simon van der Stel, appointed commander of the station in 1679, sailed False Bay in November 1687 on the ship De Noord, took the earliest recorded soundings, and described the islands, reefs and shoreline of the bay. By the end of the 17th century the general bathymetry was known.

The Whittle Rock reef is named after a lieutenant Whittle of the Royal Navy, who surveyed parts of False Bay after HMS Indent was damaged off Miller's Point soon after the first British occupation of the Cape in 1795.

There are two shipwrecks associated with the reef: The British East Indiaman Euphrates, and HMS Trident, both of which are reported to have sunk after striking the reef, but the positions of their wrecks are not recorded, though there are several large anchors of appropriate age known on the reef.

Navigational hazard 

Whittle Rock is a significant navigational hazard due to its depth and position, though very few large ships enter the bay, as fishing is limited and it is off the shipping lanes. However False Bay is occasionally used for shelter in storms. The reef is marked by a cardinal east buoy, with sound and light signals. The seas occasionally break over the top of the reef, but the shallow area is small and not easily seen in a rough sea. The reef is marked by a Cardinal East marker moored at S34°14.876' E18°33.709', about 50 m south of the main pinnacle.

Influence on wave propagation 
The reef at Whittle Rock can focus longer period south-easterly waves on Kalk Bay. This is unusual and associated with a cut-off low pressure system causing the south-easterly winds to blow for an unusually long time over enough fetch to develop a sea sufficiently for it to be refracted by the shoal area.

Economic importance 
Whittle Rock is a well known area for artisanal and recreational line fishing, and a moderately popular recreational scuba diving area.

Recreational dive sites 

Most of the recreational dive sites of False Bay, including some on the Whittle Rock reef, are in the Table Mountain National Park Marine Protected Area. A permit is required to scuba dive in any MPA in South Africa. These permits are valid for a year and are available at some branches of the Post Office. Temporary permits, valid for a month, may be available at dive shops or from dive boat operators who operate in an MPA. A personal recreational scuba diving permit is valid in all South African MPAs where recreational diving is allowed. The business permit to operate recreational scuba business operations in an MPA is restricted to a specific MPA. Diving for commercial or scientific purposes is also subject to permit.
Whittle Rock has a number of recreational dive sites which have been identified by position and named. Many of these have been partly or completely surveyed, mapped and described in the travel guide for diving the Cape Peninsula and False Bay on Wikivoyage. Some of them are listed here (north to south):

Kelly's Anchor: 
Riaan and Sven's anchor: 
East Ridge North Pinnacle: 
North-west corner pinnacles: 
September anchor: 
Whittle Rock North-west Pinnacle: 
Euphrates anchors: ,  and 
Billy's anchor: 
JJ's anchor: 
Little anchor: 
Criss-cross Cracks: 
Whittle Rock West Pinnacle: 
Whittle Rock (Shallowest pinnacle): , about 8 km offshore
Whaleback Pinnacles: 
Whittle Rock Western Reef Pinnacle: , inside the TMNPMPA
Marc's anchor: 
Whittle Rock South-east Pinnacle: 
Whaleback Rock: 
South east pinnacle chain (Neptune's bath plug): 
Flash pinnacle: 
Georgina's anchor: 
M&M Tower (the Spark plug): 
Cave Complex reef: 
Bus Stop (the Gnarly wall): 
Wreckless Rock and the Little Labyrinth: 
Table Top pinnacle: 
Mossie's Cave and pinnacle: 
Grant's Spike (South-western pinnacles): 
Labyrinth: 
Labyrinth South Pinnacle: 
Deep South Pinnacle:

Ecology and conservation 
False Bay is at the extreme western end of the inshore Agulhas marine ecoregion which extends from Cape Point to the Mbashe river over the continental shelf, in the overlap zone between Cape Agulhas and Cape Point where the warm Agulhas Current and the cooler South Atlantic waters mix. This ecoregion has the highest number of South African endemics, and is a breeding area for many species. The transition between the Agulhas ecoregion and the cooler Benguela ecoregion is at Cape Point, on the western boundary of False Bay.

The eastern boundary of the controlled area of the Table Mountain National Park Marine Protected Area is at E 018°15.000'
which passes through Whittle Rock reef. Extraction and harvesting of marine life, and other activities, are allowed on condition that one has a valid permit allowing one or more of the following specific activities: spear fishing, angling, scuba diving, snorkelling for mollusc extraction, boating, commercial diving, salvage operations, scientific research, commercial fishing, whale watching, shark cage diving or filming.

The benthic habitat types for Whittle Rock according to the National Biodiversity Assessment are hard inner shelf on the reef, and sandy inner shelf on the surrounding sand.

References

External links
Multibeam sonar images of Whittle Rock

Underwater diving sites in South Africa
Reefs of the Atlantic Ocean